Dilip Abreu is an Indian-American economist who is currently Professor of Economics at New York University. Abreu is an Elected Fellow of the American Academy of Arts and Sciences and the Econometric Society.

Early life and education

Abreu grew up in South Mumbai, and attended St Mary's School. He  earned an undergraduate degree in economics and statistics from Elphinstone College at the University of Mumbai in 1975, and a master's degree in economics and econometrics from Delhi School of Economics at University of Delhi in 1978. He earned another master's degree in economics and mathematical economics from Balliol College at University of Oxford in 1980. He enrolled in the doctoral program in economics at Princeton University under the supervision of Hugo Sonnenschein, finishing in three years. For his PhD thesis, titled Repeated Games with Discounting: A General Theory and an Application to Oligopoly, Abreu studied repeated interactions among self-interested strategic agents.

Career

Abreu joined a post-doctoral fellowship at the University of Minnesota in 1983. His first appointment was as an assistant professor at Harvard University in 1984. He joined the economics department at Princeton University as a full professor in 1990. He had a brief stint at Yale University from 1995 to 1997, whereupon he returned to Princeton as the Edward E. Matthews, Class of 1953, Professor of Finance and Professor of Economics. He has been a faculty at Princeton University for 25 years in total.

Selected publications

References

External links 
  Dilip J. Abreu at Princeton University.

Year of birth missing (living people)
Living people
Harvard University faculty
Princeton University faculty
Yale University faculty
American economists
20th-century Indian economists
21st-century Indian economists
Elphinstone College alumni
Delhi University alumni
Alumni of Balliol College, Oxford
Princeton University alumni
Fellows of the American Academy of Arts and Sciences
Fellows of the Econometric Society